Progress M-26 was a Russian unmanned Progress cargo spacecraft, which was launched in February 1995 to resupply the Mir space station.

Launch
Progress M-26 launched on 15 February 1995 from the Baikonur Cosmodrome in Kazakhstan. It used a Soyuz-U rocket.

Docking
Progress M-26 docked with the aft port of the Kvant-1 module of Mir on 17 February 1995 at 18:21:34 UTC, and was undocked on 15 March 1995 at 02:26:38 UTC.

Decay
It remained in orbit until 15 March 1995, when it was deorbited. The deorbit burn occurred at 05:28 UTC and the mission ended at 06:15 UTC.

See also

 1995 in spaceflight
 List of Progress missions
 List of uncrewed spaceflights to Mir

References

Progress (spacecraft) missions
1995 in Kazakhstan
Spacecraft launched in 1995
Spacecraft which reentered in 1995
Spacecraft launched by Soyuz-U rockets